Sir (William) Wilson Jameson  (12 May 1885 – 18 October 1962) was a Scottish medical doctor and the ninth Chief Medical Officer of England 1940 - 1950.

Jameson was born in Perth, Scotland and educated at the University of Aberdeen. He moved to London before the First World War and was appointed as Medical Officer of Health in Finchley and St Marylebone in 1920. He also trained in law and was called to the Bar in 1922. He was appointed  Dean of the London School of Hygiene and Tropical Medicine  in 1931.

He introduced much more public health information than had been seen before and was not afraid to tackle sensitive subjects such as venereal disease, the subject of a BBC broadcast in October 1942.

He was influential in the detailed planning for the introduction of the National Health Service where he worked closely with Aneurin Bevan. Subsequently, healthcare services came to be the main focus of the work of the Chief Medical Officer, rather than public health.

After retirement in 1950 he became medical adviser to the King Edward's Hospital Fund for London.

In 1952 Jameson chaired the Second British National Conference on Social Work, which was held in London.

References

1885 births
1962 deaths
Chief Medical Officers for England
20th-century Scottish medical doctors
Scottish knights
Knights Grand Cross of the Order of the British Empire
Knights Commander of the Order of the Bath